Matthew Templeton (born 28 October 1996) is an English former professional footballer who plays as a defender for Matlock Town.

Career
Templeton began his career with Barnsley progressing through the youth ranks at Oakwell, making his professional debut on 11 August 2015 in a 1–1 draw against Scunthorpe United in the League Cup which Barnsley won on penalties. He made his league debut, also against Scunthorpe, coming on for George Smith on 31 October 2015. He scored his first goal for the club on his third appearance in a 4–2 win against Blackpool on 28 December 2015.

Templeton joined Gainsborough Trinity of the National League North on loan on 6 October 2016. He made his debut the following weekend, scoring the winning goal in a 3–2 victory over Tamworth. After another loan spell at North Ferriby United, he was released by Barnsley in May 2017, before signing for Worksop Town. In January 2018 he joined Matlock Town on dual registration terms.

References

External links

1996 births
Living people
English footballers
Association football defenders
Barnsley F.C. players
Macclesfield Town F.C. players
Gainsborough Trinity F.C. players
North Ferriby United A.F.C. players
Worksop Town F.C. players
Matlock Town F.C. players
English Football League players
National League (English football) players